Marie Claire Mukasine (born in 1959) is a Rwandan lawyer, politician and civil servant. From 2011 to 2019 she was a member of the Senate of Rwanda, and has served as a permanent secretary in Rwanda's Ministry of Infrastructure. In 2020 she was appointed Chairperson of the National Commission for Human Rights in Rwanda (NHCR).

Education 
Mukasine holds a bachelor's degree in law, two master's degrees in management and public administration, and a PhD in law.

Career 
Mukasine has served in various leadership positions such as the executive secretary for Haguruka, a charity promoting and defending the rights of women and children. She has served as a permanent secretary in the Rwandan Ministry of Gender and Family Promotion. She has also been the director general of Rwanda Investment Group (RIG), and director general of the insurance company Sonarwa. In 2013 she was director of the National Insurance Corporation.

In 2011 Mukasine was elected to the Rwandan Senate as the representative for Southern Province, and served as senator until 2019. In 2017 she was amongst senators calling for stalled regional development projects to be fast-tracked. She was a member of the Senatorial Standing Committee on Political Affairs and Good Governance, and in 2018 highlighted the need to plan reintegration of former prisoners convicted of genocide:

Mukasine has also served as president of the Rwanda chapter of African Parliamentarians Network Against Corruption (APNAC).

On 29 June 2020, Mukasine was sworn in as the Chairperson of the National Commission for Human Rights in Rwanda (NHCR). In October 2020 she asked Parliament to increase the NHCR's budget and to provide it with permanent residence in Kigali.

References 

Living people
1959 births
Human rights activists
Rwandan lawyers
Rwandan women lawyers
21st-century Rwandan women politicians
21st-century Rwandan politicians
Members of the Senate (Rwanda)
21st-century women lawyers